Serbian Railways Infrastructure is the national railway infrastructure asset management company of Serbia.

History
In March 2015, the Government of Serbia announced its plan to establish three new railway companies, splitting the Serbian Railways state-owned company in separate businesses – passenger (Srbija Voz), cargo (Srbija Kargo) and infrastructure (Serbian Railways Infrastructure). Srbija Voz was founded on 10 August 2015, as the national passenger railway company of Serbia, after being split from the Serbian Railways, in the process of reconstruction and better optimization of business.

See also
 Transport in Serbia
 Serbian Railways
 Srbija Kargo
 Srbija Voz

References

External links
 

Companies based in Belgrade
Government-owned companies of Serbia
Rail transport in Serbia
Railway companies established in 2015
Serbian Railways
Transport companies of Serbia
Serbian companies established in 2015